The Initiative for Poland or  IdP, was a short-lived centre-right Christian democratic Polish political party.

History
The party was created in Poznań on the 14 June 2003 on the initiative of the former finance minister Aldona Kamela-Sowińska Among the first members were Andrzej Sośnierz, Zbigniew Zysk and Władysław Medwid.

For the 2004 European parliamentary elections the party had a host of famous candidates on their electoral lists, notably Barbara Borys-Damięcka (former senator and film director),  Wilibald Winkler (former Silesian voivode), Andrzej Wiszniewski (former minister for education), Dorota Czudowska (former senator), Wojciech Szczęsny Kaczmarek  (former mayor of Poznań), Bartłomiej Sochański (former mayor of Szczecin), Korneliusz Pacuda (journalist), Tomasz Wójtowicz (Olympian and volleyball player) and Ryszard Jankowski (former football manager). They received 88565 votes, an overall share of 1.45%.

In the autumn of 2004 there were serious talks of a merger with the Centre Party but this never materialised in the end.

In 2005 for the parliamentary elections that year the majority used Civic Platform's electoral lists whilst a minority used the Centre Party's lists.

On the 5 January 2006 at the party AGM, it was decided that the party will be dissolved. Most of the activists joined other political parties, most joined the Civic Platform. The party was officially de-registered on 29 September 2006.

References

2003 establishments in Poland
Centre-right parties in Europe
Political parties established in 2003
Political parties in Poland
2006 disestablishments in Poland
Political parties disestablished in 2006
Christian democratic parties in Poland
Christian democratic parties in Europe